"It's Like We Never Said Goodbye" is a song written by Roger Greenaway and Geoff Stephens, and recorded by American country music singer Crystal Gayle.  It was released in February 1980 as the second single from the album Miss the Mississippi. The song was number one for one week and spent a total of fourteen weeks on the charts.

Historic week
The song was part of a historic week on the Billboard Hot Country Singles chart in the week it reached number one, April 19, 1980. That week, all of the top five positions were held by female singers.

The Top 5 from that week was:
 "It's Like We Never Said Goodbye" by Crystal Gayle
 "A Lesson in Leavin'" by Dottie West
 "Are You on the Road to Lovin' Me Again" by Debby Boone
 "Beneath Still Waters" by Emmylou Harris
 "Two Story House" by Tammy Wynette (duet with George Jones)

Personnel
Gene Chrisman – drums
Spady Brannan – bass guitar
Bobby Wood – keyboards
Chris Leuzinger – guitars
Billy Puett, Denis Solee – saxophone
Roger Bissell, Dennis Good, Rex Peer, Terry Williams – trombone
Crystal Gayle, Garth Fundis, Allen Reynolds - backing vocals

Charts

Weekly charts

Year-end charts

References

Bibliography
Whitburn, Joel, "Top Country Songs: 1944-2005," 2006, Record Research, 

1980 singles
Crystal Gayle songs
Songs written by Roger Greenaway
Songs written by Geoff Stephens
Song recordings produced by Allen Reynolds
Columbia Records singles
1979 songs